Theta Reticuli is double star in southern constellation of Reticulum, located just  south of Alpha Reticuli. The pair are visible to the naked eye as a dim, white-hued point of light with a combined apparent visual magnitude of 5.88. They lie at roughly the same distance from the Sun based on parallax, with the primary being around 466 light-years away. They also share a similar proper motion, suggesting they may be gravitationally bound.

The magnitude 6.05 primary, designated component A, has a stellar classification of B9IV, matching a B-type subgiant. It is 166 million years old with 3.4 times the mass of the Sun.

It is most likely a very young main-sequence star, and is an Am star with a stellar classification of kA2hA5VmA7. This notation indicates the spectrum displays the K-line of an A2-type star, the hydrogen lines of a cooler A5 star, and the metal lines of an A7 star. This system is a source of X-ray emission, which may be coming from the companion.

References

B-type subgiants
A-type main-sequence stars
Am stars
Double stars
Suspected variables

Reticuli, Theta
Reticulum (constellation)
Durchmusterung objects
027657
020020
1372